Camp Mather is the  Sierra Nevada family summer camp run by the San Francisco Recreation & Parks Department which welcomes nearly 10,000 campers each summer.  Founded in 1923, the camp opened in 1924 and offers nearly three months of week-long camping experiences each year.

Area History
The area now known as Camp Mather was originally inhabited by the Miwok people.  Dozens of acorn mortar sites suggest the connection between the Miwok and this parcel of land goes back 2,000 to 10,000 years.

Cyrill Carpenter Smith (1827-1900) and his brother, Dorilas (1835-1882)  arrived in the area around 1853, and secured rights to the property under certificates of preemption.  Cyrill homesteaded his property in 1884.  Cyrill's sister-in-law homesteaded her husband's property.  Cyrill originally bought the property, which included Hetch Hetchy Valley and the camp’s northwest corner.  The Smith brothers purchased their property from the federal government for $1.25 per acre.  Cyrill built a log cabin on the property, which still stands.  The brothers acquired additional property and Cyrill later bought out his brother.  The property ownership moved to Cyrill’s son, Elmer E. Smith, when Cyrill died in 1900.

The brothers raised sheep in Merced and grazed them on their Sierra property during the spring and summer months. Federally-owned land in the area was freely-available for grazing as well. It is presumed that hogs and bacon sold at their Sierra ranch resulted in the area's nickname, Hog Ranch.
Seeking a reliable water supply, the City of San Francisco purchased their properties in 1909 for $550 per acre.

After Hog Ranch was purchased by the City, it was transformed into a lumber mill and railway station to support the construction of O'Shaughnessy Dam.    The Hetch Hetchy Railroad reached the site in late 1917.  The rail ran east-west through the camp and a branch line of the California Peach and Fig Growers Railroad ran to the south where lumber was harvested for packing boxes.        A large pit was dug for gravel:   it later filled in naturally to form Birch Lake.

Camp Development

With the construction of the dam and lake, tourism was expected to flourish.  The Hetch Hetchy Lodge obtained a 20-year lease to operate a lodge and cabins  The Lodge built the Jack Spring Dining Hall in 1921. The Lodge operated from 1921 to 1923.

Promotion of a city camp was led by groups of hikers as early as 1921.

In 1923, Mary Margaret Morgan, the first woman on the San Francisco Playgrounds Commission, promoted opening a Sierras summer camp similar to those provided by Berkeley and Oakland (later transferred to San Jose) to their residents.  She insisted that the camp open in 1924.  The camp was first called the Margaret Maryland Playground.  The 328-acre camp opened on July 5, 1924 with 35 cabins from the sawmill era.  Campers arrived after a 15-hour ferry and train trip from San Francisco.

The railroad station was first named Hog Ranch.  The station was then named for Stephen Mather, the first director of the National Park Service. The camp then adopted the railroad station name. 

Polling booths were moved from San Francisco to form the original camp cabins.

When San Francisco determined that there would be no water activities on the lake, the tourism dream evaporated.  When the City of San Francisco offered to take over the lease, the Hetch Hetchy Lodge company quickly agreed, adding 22 cabins to the camp.

The Carnegie Cabin was built in 1926 for Dr. Hall who conducted studies of growing plants at various elevations. The camp's elevation of 4,610 feet was the intermediate of three elevations tested.

The Recreation Commission recommended improvements at Camp Mather in the amount of $3.1 million in 1933.

Campsites were also introduced prior to 1993.

Ten "new", larger lakeside cabins were added in 1955.

The 1996 Ackerson Fire, which burned large areas to the north and east of Camp Mather, closed the Camp mid-August that year.

Cabins #60 and #61 were replaced with a new design in 2001.  Camps 1 to 9 were relocated between the summers of 2018 and 2019.

A viral outbreak thought to be norovirus affected campers and staff in 2011.

The Rim Fire burned to the edges of Camp Mather in 2013.  Only one building was reported lost within the camp.  The area which includes the Carnegie Cabin and Hog Ranch Cabin did not burn. 

The seven-night camp week (Saturday to Saturday) was shortened to a six-night camp week (Sunday to Saturday) in 2016.

The camp's operations were impacted by a viral outbreak and the Ferguson Fire in 2018.

Two new single-story staff dormitory buildings were added at the east end of camp in 2019.

 
The camp was closed during the years 2020 and 2021 because of the COVID-19 pandemic.  Weeks 1, 4 and 5 (of 11 scheduled weeks) were lost during the summer of 2022 because of staff COVID-19 outbreaks.  Part of an additional week was lost because of smoke from the Washburn Fire.

Activities
The camp is noted for an extensive program of activities.  Crafts such as lanyard-making, friendship bracelet tying, shirt tie-dying and button-making have been offered.  The staff and camper talent shows draw large crowds.

Nature and historical hikes are offered by the naturalists.  A ropes course offers several different challenges each day.  A corral offers horse and pony rides on a concession basis.  The swimming pool and Birch Lake are very popular with visitors:  all open hours are staffed with multiple lifeguards.

Three full meals are provided in the dining hall each day.

Camp participation
The camp is operated by the San Francisco Recreation and Parks Department.  San Francisco residents and property owners have first priority for summer registration for seven-day, six-night stays.  A lottery is held to assign cabins and place others on the wait list.  In 2022, approximately 1,500 cabin registrations were awarded and nearly 1,000 applicants were placed on the waitlist.  Free or lower-cost camping has been offered to enable participation by lower-income residents.  Having operated for nearly a century, many families have come to Camp Mather for multiple generations.

Senior Camp, a short-week camp for senior citizens has been held at the beginning and/or end of the regular family camp season.  Inclusion Week is held during the regular family camp season and is designed to accommodate and encourage the participation of people with disabilities.

7,000 people attended each of two long-weekend Strawberry Music Festivals which were held the Memorial Day and Labor Day weekends.  These were held at Camp Mather from 1982 until 2013 when the Rim Fire affected camping conditions.  Campers did not use the cabins, but extensive tent and RV camping was permitted.

References

External links
 official site 
 official camp video 
 Friends of Camp Mather - not-for-profit which supports Camp Mather 
 Strawberry Music Festival

Notes

San Francisco